The West Two River is a  tributary of the Saint Louis River in northern Minnesota, United States.  It rises west of the city of Mountain Iron and flows south, reaching the Saint Louis River in McDavitt Township.

See also
List of rivers of Minnesota

References

External links
Minnesota Watersheds
USGS Hydrologic Unit Map - State of Minnesota (1974)

Rivers of Minnesota
Rivers of St. Louis County, Minnesota